Capillaria is a genus of nematodes in the family Capillariidae (or, according to classifications, in the family Trichinellidae).

Since the taxonomy of the Capillariidae is disputed, species are included within the single genus Capillaria or 22 different genera (Amphibiocapillaria, Aonchotheca, Baruscapillaria, Calodium, Capillaria, Capillostrongyloides, Crocodylocapillaria, Echinocoleus, Eucoleus, Freitascapillaria, Gessyella, Liniscus, Paracapillaria, Paracapillaroides, Pearsonema, Paratrichosoma, Pseudocapillaria, Piscicapillaria, Pseudocapillaroides, Pterothominx, Schulmanela, and Tenoranema). 
Some species parasitic in fish, previously classified within Capillaria, are now included in Huffmanela (family Trichosomoididae).

Old literature, and sometimes modern medical literature, use Capillaria as a genus for species included in all these genera.
The term Capillariasis is generally used for diseases produced by species of Capillaria, even if the species is now placed in another genus.

Species

Species in the genus Capillaria include (among hundreds of described species):
 Capillaria aerophila; modern name Eucoleus aerophilus; a parasite of the respiratory system of foxes and other mammals
 Capillaria gastrica; a parasite of rodents
 Capillaria hepatica; modern name Calodium hepaticum; cause of hepatic capillariasis in humans
 Capillaria philippinensis; modern name Paracapillaria philippinensis; cause of intestinal capillariasis in humans
 Capillaria plica; modern name Pearsonema plica; a parasite of the urinary system of dogs and other mammals
 Capillaria feliscati; modern name Pearsonema feliscati; a parasite of the urinary system of cats and other mammals

See also 
Capillariasis, a disease caused by some Capillaria species

References 

Enoplea genera
Parasitic nematodes of mammals